Triage is the second solo album by David Baerwald, formerly of the two-man group David & David. It was released in 1993 on A&M Records. Baerwald had wanted the album to come out before the 1992 United States presidential election, but it was pushed back several months.

Baerwald supported the album by participating in the "In Their Own Words" tour, along with Lisa Germano, Freedy Johnston, Johnny Clegg, and Michael Barabas.

Production
The album was produced by Bill Bottrell, Baerwald, and Dan Schwartz. Baerwald was open to different musical styles and tried not to limit the music to any specific genre. Many of its songs were influenced by politics and conspiracy theories. The album is dedicated to politicians and government officials disliked by Baerwald. The album cover is a photograph of bloody hands on top of the American flag; the liner notes contain photos of the FBI file on Baerwald's father.

Herb Alpert played trumpet on "A Secret Silken World"; due to its theme of sadism, Joni Mitchell allegedly counseled against recording the song. "Nobody" was written after Baerwald tagged along with members of the LAPD gang division. "A Bitter Tree" addresses adultery. The voices of Jim Jones and George Herbert Walker Bush are sampled on "The Postman". The closing two songs incorporate more optimistic sentiments.

Critical reception

The New York Times wrote that the album "leavens its juicy dollops of depravity and paranoia with just enough humor to keep from being an apocalyptic bore." The Calgary Herald noted that Baerwald's "voice—singing, mumbling and shouting those powerful lyrics—carries Triage, with the music pushed down to a subtle supporting role."

The Chicago Tribune concluded that "it's an ambitious work, but heavy-handedness has often been Baerwald's bane." The Los Angeles Times opined that, "like Roger Waters' recent work, Baerwald's well-crafted sonics fail to clothe his ambitious lyrical ideas in sufficient pop appeal." The Philadelphia Inquirer considered Triage to be "ponderous, self-obsessed singer-songwriter indulgence."

AllMusic rated Triage 4.5 out of 5 stars, deeming it "a bumpy ride."

Track listing

Personnel
 David Baerwald – vocals, guitars, keyboards, bass
 Bill Bottrell – guitars, keyboards, vocals, loops
 Greg Arreguin – guitar
 Dan Schwartz – bass, guitar
 David Kemper – drums
 Brian MacLeod – drums
 Kevin Gilbert – piano, drums
 Herb Alpert – trumpet on "A Secret Silken World"

References

External links
 A Fine Mess (Official David Baerwald website)
  Triage at Discogs.com

David Baerwald albums
1993 albums
A&M Records albums